Hat Khanom–Mu Ko Thale Tai is a national park in the process of being established . It is in southern Thailand, covering territory of the districts Khanom and Sichon of Nakhon Si Thammarat Province and Don Sak and Ko Samui of Surat Thani Province.

The name of the park refers to the two major parts of the park. Hat Khanom refers to the beaches of Khanom District, and the Thale Tai archipelago consists of eight islands in the Gulf of Thailand (Ko Mut Tang, Ko Mut Kong, Ko Rap, Ko Hua Ta Khe, Ko Wang Nai, Ko Wang Nak, Ko Noi, and Ko Ta Rai, all in the Sichon and Khanom District, Nakhon Si Thammarat Province, and Ko Samui District, Surat Thani) between Khanom and Ko Samui.

Geography
The area of the park is 194,797 rai ~ . Most of the area is covered with primary forest which is the provenance of many creeks. The park contains limestone mountains and mangrove forests.

Climate
Southwesterly and northeasterly winds result in rainfall almost all year round. There are two seasons, summer (February–April) and rainy season (May–January).

Flora and fauna

Primary forests consist of plants such as Intsia palembanica, Dipterocarpus species, Ironwood, Sandoricum koetjape and Indian oak. Mangrove forests with valuable plants such as mangroves, taboon and Thespesia populneoides. Limestone mountain contain plants such as chanpah and Opuntia elatior.

Mammals – Sus scrofa (wild pig), monkey, semno, squirrel, Menetes berdmorei (Indochinese ground squirrel), Naemorhedus sumatraensis, Muntiacus muntjak, Ursus malayanus, tiger, sambar, gibbon, and Malayan sun bear.
Birds – Spilornis cheela (crested), Treron curvirostra (thick-billed pigeon), Copsychus saularis (Oriental), shama, dove, cormorant, Nicobar pigeon, seagull, Egretta sacra (Pacific reef egret) and Ducula aenea (green imperial)
Reptiles – tortoise, snakes and chameleon.
Amphibians – different kinds of frogs, Bufo asper.
Other aquatic life – Channa striatus (serpenthead), crab, shrimp, saltwater fish, soro brook carp, and snakeheads.

See also
List of national parks of Thailand
List of Protected Areas Regional Offices of Thailand

References

National parks of Thailand
Geography of Nakhon Si Thammarat province
Tourist attractions in Nakhon Si Thammarat province
Geography of Surat Thani province
Tourist attractions in Surat Thani province